Chilo chiriquitensis is a moth in the family Crambidae. It was described by Philipp Christoph Zeller in 1877. It is found in Mexico, Panama and Guatemala.

References

Chiloini
Moths described in 1877